Philipp Müller (born 3 March 1995) is a German footballer who plays as a forward for Eintracht Norderstedt.

Career

Club career
Müller joined Preußen Münster for the 2018/19 season. He left the club at the end of the season. Müller remained without club until 21 January 2020, where he signed a deal until June 2021 with Regionalliga club FC Viktoria 1889 Berlin.

References

External links
 
 

German footballers
Association football forwards
FC Eintracht Norderstedt 03 players
Hamburger SV players
Hamburger SV II players
VfL Wolfsburg players
SV Wehen Wiesbaden players
SC Preußen Münster players
FC Viktoria 1889 Berlin players
3. Liga players
Regionalliga players
Footballers from Hamburg
1995 births
Living people
21st-century German people